= Jay Chris =

- Genres: Latin Rock, rock
- Occupation: producer
- Years active: 1999–present
- Label: Zamic Corporation SL
- Member of: Salamandra
- Website: jaychris.com

John Christian Contreras known as Jay Chris is a Costa Rican singer and producer of the Paraguayan band Salamandra born on March 8, 1982.

== Career ==
Jay Chris is the producer of the Paraguayan band Salamandra from the beginnings of the musical group in 1999 although his first demo released it in 2009 and to date they have 6 albums of studies published in the musical market.

Salamandra began in late 1999, early 2000, it all started as they prepared to play at a festival, what they did not know was that Salamandra would outlast that festival that year at Ypacarai: "we were getting ready to play at a festival Annual school of Don Bosco Ypacarai and then continued the frequency with which we were playing the songs and we all consolidated and never finished the group. "From the beginning of the band, they dedicated themselves to produce their own songs, with which they appeared To small festivals of the city of Ypacarai and surroundings. In 2004, they recorded for the first time a handful of songs in a demo called "Cianuro", which included songs that continue to appear in their repertoire The first media appearance of the band comes in 2005 when they arrive at the final stages of the contest "I want to play in Pilsen Rock" (whose prize was to participate in the Festival " Pilsen Rock " the biggest rock event in the country.)

== Discography ==
Year	Album title
2009	El taco picoso
2009	Reflejo
2010	Todo en tu cabeza
2013	Vamos de gira
2013	Salamandra Acustico
2015	Alma en peña

== Awards and nominations ==
Año	Premiación	Categoría	Resultado
2014	Premios 40 América Buenos Aires 2014	Best Artist or Band from Paraguay	Nominado

El elegido Rock & Pop (Paraguay):

- 2010:Best national rock theme (Todo en tu Cabeza) – 2.º Puesto.
- 2011: Theme of the Year – 1.^{er} Puesto (Finito)

Venus Awards (Paraguay):

- 2010: Best National Artist: Nominated.
- 2011: Best National Group – for the song Disomnilán: Winner

50 Personalities of the Year 2011 According to Amnesty International (Paraguay) Amnesty International's 50th anniversary commemorative campaign.
